Gustavo Ramírez (born 15 May 1941) is a Guatemalan wrestler. He competed in two events at the 1968 Summer Olympics.

References

External links
 

1941 births
Living people
Guatemalan male sport wrestlers
Olympic wrestlers of Guatemala
Wrestlers at the 1968 Summer Olympics
People from San Marcos Department